Pagadala Naidu (born 9 October 1990) is an Indian former cricketer. He played fifteen first-class matches for Hyderabad between 2010 and 2013.

See also
 List of Hyderabad cricketers

References

External links
 

1990 births
Living people
Indian cricketers
Hyderabad cricketers
Cricketers from Hyderabad, India